Midnight Oil is the debut album by Australian rock band Midnight Oil which was recorded in 1977 and released in November 1978 on the band's independent Powderworks label. It reached the top 50 on the Australian Kent Music Report Albums Chart. The album was later distributed by CBS Records and issued as a CD. The LP has a blue cover, however, the CD has a black cover. Because of the blue cover, the former version is often referred to, by fans, as the "blue album" or "the Blue Meanie". The lead single, "Run by Night", became the band's first minor hit in Australia and appeared on the Kent Music Report Singles Chart Top 100. It also had a video clip.

Background
Midnight Oil is the debut album by the Australian rock group of the same name. In late 1976, the line-up of Peter Garrett on vocals and synthesiser, Rob Hirst on drums, Andrew James on bass guitar and Jim Moginie on keyboards and lead guitar were performing together in Sydney as the progressive and surf rock group, Farm. They changed their name to Midnight Oil and began to develop an aggressive, punk-hard rock sound for their pub rock audiences. Guitarist Martin Rotsey joined in 1977 and Midnight Oil, with their manager Gary Morris, established their own record label Powderworks.

In June 1978 they entered the Alberts Studio in Sydney with producer Keith Walker, from local radio station 2JJ, to record their debut eponymous album, Midnight Oil, which was released by Powderworks in November 1978 and peaked at No. 43 on the Australian Kent Music Report Albums Chart. Midnight Oil's first single "Run by Night" followed in December, but had very little chart success peaking at No. 100 on the related singles chart.

The band built a dedicated fan base, initially restricted to Sydney, which was extended to other Australian cities through constant touring – performing some 200 gigs in their first year. They became known for their furious live performances, which featured the two guitarists Moginie and Rotsey, the drumming and vocals of Hirst and the presence of the towering, bald Garrett as lead singer. The Midnight Oil LP disappointed some critics as it did not capture their powerful live performances, with undemanding playing and Garrett's vocals sounding stilted.

Reception
Reviewed in Australian Rolling Stone, by Richard McGregor, it was described as, "a reasonably accurate showcase for the talents of the band, and as such it emphasises all the strengths and weaknesses. The main problem seems to be Peter Garrett's voice. Stripped of the menace of his mesmerising onstage presence, it often sounds fragile". McGregor noted that, "Midnight Oil's strength is in the kinetic energy of their playing" and described them as "an authentic Sydney band, unlike The Angels, Cold Chisel, and Dragon".

Track listing

Charts

Certifications and sales

Personnel
Midnight Oil
 Peter Garrett – lead vocals
 Rob Hirst – drums, vocals
 Andrew James – bass guitar
 Jim Moginie – guitar, keyboards
 Martin Rotsey – guitar

Recording details
 Producer – Keith Walker
 Engineer – Keith Walker
 Studios – Albert Studios (recorded, mixed), Sydney

Art works
 Design – Jan Paul, Midnight Oil (sleeve & cover)
 Photography – Kathleen O'Brien, Kevin Fewster; Jan Paul (back cover)

References

External links
 Midnight Oil

1978 debut albums
Sprint Music albums
Midnight Oil albums